Umbagog Lake is a wilderness lake located in Coös County, New Hampshire, and Oxford County, Maine. It is one of the most pristine lakes in the state of New Hampshire. It lies in the towns of Errol, New Hampshire, and Upton, Maine, as well as the townships of Cambridge, New Hampshire, and Magalloway Plantation, Maine. The name Umbagog is properly pronounced with the stress on the second syllable (um-BAY-gog) and is said to come from the Abenaki word for "shallow water".  Both "Lake Umbagog" and "Umbagog Lake" are commonly used and accepted when referring to the body of water.

Geography 
The lake is part of the Umbagog National Wildlife Refuge and Umbagog Lake State Park. Along its southernmost shore, there is a public campground and a public boat launch ramp which may be accessed from New Hampshire Route 26. There are 33 wilderness campsites, accessible only by boat, which are located around the lake. An interesting feature along its northwest shore is an expansive natural floating island composed of generations of decomposing marshland vegetation. The area is abundant with wildlife, including coyote, wild turkey, bald eagle, osprey, bobcat, moose, rabbit, bear, loons and many other native species.

The lake's area and depth were markedly increased with the construction of a dam at Errol in the 19th century.

Umbagog Lake is fed by the Magalloway River, the Rapid River, and the Dead Cambridge River. It is the source of the Androscoggin River.

The lake is classified as a warmwater fishery, with observed species including smallmouth bass, chain pickerel, horned pout, and northern pike.

Notable residents 
 Metallak, Androscoggin elder

See also

List of lakes in Maine
List of lakes in New Hampshire

References

External links
 

Lakes of Coös County, New Hampshire
Lakes of Oxford County, Maine
North Maine Woods
Northern Forest Canoe Trail
Lakes of Maine
Lakes of New Hampshire
Maine placenames of Native American origin
New Hampshire placenames of Native American origin